Indian weapons may refer to:
 Native American weaponry
 Weapons of India, see Indian martial arts and Military history of India